Mikhaylov or Mikhaylova, also transliterated as Mikhailov or Mihaylov, is a surname that is derived from the male given name Mikhail and literally means Mikhail's.

Geographical distribution
As of 2014, 84.7% of all known bearers of the surname Mikhaylov were residents of Russia (frequency 1:795), 7.0% of Ukraine (1:3,051), 2.2% of Kazakhstan (1:3,694), 2.2% of Belarus (1:2,047) and 2.0% of Uzbekistan (1:7,109).

In Russia, the frequency of the surname was higher than national average (1:795) in the following subjects of the Russian Federation:

 1. Chuvashia (1:114)
 2. Pskov Oblast (1:146)
 3. Novgorod Oblast (1:159)
 4. Mari El (1:205)
 5. Leningrad Oblast (1:254)
 6. Sakha Republic (1:256)
 7. Amur Oblast (1:338)
 8. Tver Oblast (1:372)
 9. Zabaykalsky Krai (1:406)
 10. Kostroma Oblast (1:451)
 11. Stavropol Krai (1:480)
 12. Saint Petersburg (1:512)
 13. Smolensk Oblast (1:515)
 14. Jewish Autonomous Oblast (1:534)
 15. Komi Republic (1:580)
 16. Krasnoyarsk Krai (1:637)
 17. Murmansk Oblast (1:650)
 18. Tomsk Oblast (1:665)
 19. Republic of Karelia (1:670)
 20. Udmurtia (1:673)
 21. Yaroslavl Oblast (1:673)
 22. Samara Oblast (1:688)
 23. Kemerovo Oblast (1:710)
 24. Volgograd Oblast (1:757)
 25. Buryatia (1:758)
 26. Khakassia (1:788)
 27. Irkutsk Oblast (1:789)

People
Adrian Mikhaylov (1853–1929), Russian revolutionary
Aksinia Mihaylova (born 1963), Bulgarian translator, editor and poet
Alexey Iosifovich Mikhaylov (1895–1941), Soviet officer
Aleksei Vladimirovich Mikhaylov (born 1983), Russian footballer
Alexander Mikhaylov (disambiguation), several people
Anani Mikhaylov (born 1948), Bulgarian fencer
Anatoly Mikhaylov (1936–2022), Soviet hurdler
Andrei Mihailov (born 1980), Moldovan backstroke swimmer
Antonio Mihaylov (born 1991), Bulgarian footballer
Atanas Mihaylov (1949–2006), Bulgarian footballer
Biser Mihaylov (1943–2020), Bulgarian footballer
Boris Mikhailov (born 1944), Soviet ice hockey player
Boris Mikhailov (born 1938), Soviet and Ukrainian photographer
 (1908–1984), Soviet chemist
Borislav Mihaylov (born 1963), Bulgarian footballer
Dmitry Mikhaylov (born 1976), Russian football player and coach
Eduard Mikhaylov (born 1972), Russian football player
Egor Mikhailov (born 1978), Russian ice hockey player
Ekaterina Mihaylova (born 1956), Bulgarian politician
Emil Mihaylov (born 1988), Bulgarian footballer
Felix Mikhailov (1930–2006), Soviet and Russian psychologist
Gennady Mikhaylov (born 1974), Russian road bicycle racer
Gorazd Mihajlov (born 1974), Macedonian footballer
Iskra Mihaylova (born 1957), Bulgarian politician
Ivan Mihailov (1896–1990), Bulgarian revolutionary
Ivan Mihailov (born 1944), Bulgarian boxer
Ivaylo Mihaylov (born 1991), Bulgarian footballer
Ivo Mihaylov (born 1989), Bulgarian footballer
Ivomira Mihaylova (born 1990), Bulgarian judoka
Kalvis Mihailovs (born 1988), Latvian orienteering competitor
Katya Sambuca (born Yekaterina Mikhailova, 1991), Russian singer, actress, television presenter, and erotic model
 (1893–1944), Bulgarian politician
Kiril Mihaylov (born 1986), Bulgarian footballer
Konstantin Mikhailov (disambiguation), several people
Larissa Mikhailova (born 1981), Kazakhstani water polo player
 (1872–1928), Russian revolutionary
Lev Mikhailov (1936–2003), Soviet and Russian clarinetist and saxophonist
Lev Mikhaylov (1938–2004), Soviet figure skater
Lilian Mihaylov (born 1994), Bulgarian badminton player
Maxim Mikhailov (1893–1971), Russian opera singer
Maxim Mikhaylov (born 1988), Russian volleyball player
Mikhail Mikhaylov (disambiguation), several people
Nadezhda Neynsky (born Nadezhda Mihaylova, 1962), Bulgarian politician
Natalia Mikhailova (born 1986), Russian competitive ice dancer
Nikolay Mihaylov (born 1988), Bulgarian racing cyclist
Nikolay Mihaylov (born 1988), Bulgarian football player
Nikolay Mikhaylov (1932–2006), Soviet military conductor
Nikolay Mikhaylov (born 1948), Bulgarian ice hockey player
 (1905–1982), Soviet writer
Nikolay Ivanovich Mikhaylov (1915–1992), Soviet geographer
Nina Kulagina (born Ninel Mikhaylova; 1926–1990), Russian woman who claimed to have psychic powers
Oleg Mikhaylov (disambiguation), several people
Olga Mikhaylova (born 1986), Russian race walker
P. Mikhailov, Russian soloist with the Alexandrov Ensemble
Polina Mikhaylova (born 1986), Russian table tennis player
Ruslan Mikhaylov (born 1979), Russian footballer
Sergey Mikhaylov (disambiguation), several people
Snezhana Mikhaylova (born 1954), Bulgarian basketball player
 (1821–1861), Russian historian, folklorist, and writer
Serafim Mihaylov (born 1995), Bulgarian footballer
Stas Mikhaylov (born 1969), Russian singer-songwriter
Tanja Mihhailova (born 1983), Estonian singer
Tatsiana Mikhailava (born 1987), Belarusian female speed skater
Timofey Mikhaylov (1859–1881), Russian revolutionary, member of Narodnaya Volya
Valeria Mikhailova (born 2002), Russian competitive figure skater
Viktor Mikhaylov (academic) (1934–2011), Russian academic and nuclear scientist
Viktor Mikhailov (1924–2021), Soviet and Russian military officer
Vitalii Mihailov (1976), Moldovan judoka
Vitaly Mikhailov (born 1986), Belarusian long track speed skater
Vladimir Mikhaylov (disambiguation), multiple people
Yekaterina Mikhailova-Demina (1925–2019), Soviet military doctor, Hero of the Soviet Union
Yevgeniya Mikhaylova (born 1949), Russian politician, educator and psychologist
Yuri Mikhaylov (1930–2008), Soviet speed skater

References

Russian-language surnames
Bulgarian-language surnames
Patronymic surnames
Surnames from given names